Serenades is the full-length debut album by British rock band Anathema. It was released in February 1993 through Peaceville Records.

It is their only album to feature Darren White on lead vocals. Rhythm guitarist Vincent Cavanagh sang lead on all subsequent albums.

Background 

Serenades expands on material from The Crestfallen EP, but features more experimentation and variation throughout. It was recorded between June and September 1992 at Yorkshire-based Academy Studios, the same place where The Crestfallen had been recorded one year prior.

Composition 
Serenades is mainly a death-doom album. Lyrical themes include being lovelorn ("Lovelorn Rhapsody"), trauma and war ("Sleepless") and lust ("Under a Veil [Of Black Lace]"). The album closes with a 23-minute ambient track.

Track listing 
All lyrics written by Darren J. White, all music written by Danny Cavanagh.

Personnel 

 Darren J. White – vocals
 John Douglas – drums
 Duncan Patterson – bass
 Danny Cavanagh – lead guitar
 Vincent Cavanagh – rhythm guitar

Guest musicians
 Ruth Wilson – vocals on "J'ai fait une promesse"

Production
 Paul "Hammy" Halmshaw – producer
 David Penprase – photography (cover)
 Darren J. White – photography
 Keith Appleton – mixing
 Mags – producer
 Dave Pybus – design, layout
 Porl Medlock – photography (black & white)

Notes 
An alternate version of the song "Lovelorn Rhapsody" had been featured on the Peaceville Volume 4 compilation.
The 1994 US version of the album is called Serenades + Extra Tracks. It omits "Dreaming: The Romance", and in its place, adds a studio version of the demo song "All Faith is Lost" as well as the entirety of The Crestfallen EP. It also has a red-orange front cover instead of the original's yellow-orange front cover. This version was released by the Futurist subsidiary of MCA Records.
The Japanese Import version of the album features the song "Nailed to the Cross/666" as a bonus track.
 The album has also been released as a double CD with The Crestfallen.
 A remastered version of the album was released on CD in 2003, and is the current and most widely pressed CD release. It restores "Dreaming: The Romance" and also adds all tracks from the single release We Are The Bible.
 Serenades was finally released on vinyl in 2012. It is based on the 2003 audio remaster. However, it has neither "Dreaming: The Romance" nor any bonus tracks, making it the shortest commercially available version of the album to date.
 Orchestral versions of "J'ai fait une promesse" and "Sleep in Sanity" were recorded for the 2011 compilation Falling Deeper.

References 

1993 debut albums
Anathema (band) albums
Peaceville Records albums
Death-doom albums